Baimovo (Bayım) is a rural locality (a selo) and the administrative center of Baimovskoye Rural Settlement, Abzelilovsky District, Bashkortostan, Russia. The population was 1,015 as of 2010. There are 15 streets.

Geography 
Baimovo is located 66 km northeast of Askarovo (the district's administrative centre) by road. Tuishevo is the nearest rural locality.

References 

Rural localities in Abzelilovsky District